Morena railway station is a small railway station in Morena district, Madhya Pradesh. Its code is MRA. It serves Morena city. The station is classified under 80 A class stations across India. this. Station is a Wifi free available in providing by Indian Railways.

The station is well connected by train services to all parts of the country including Delhi, Agra Bhopal, Mumbai,Nagpur Hyderabad, Chennai, Pune, Jaipur, Indore' Jabalpur and other major cities.

Major trains

Some of the important trains that runs from Morena are :

 New Delhi–Habibganj Shatabdi Express
 Chhattisgarh Express
 Khajuraho–Udaipur City Express
 Jhelum Express
 Kalinga Utkal Express
 Gorakhpur–Okha Express
 Ujjaini Express
 Sushasan Express
 Indore–Chandigarh Express
 Andaman Express
 Shaan-e-Bhopal Express
 Mangala Lakshadweep Express
 Dakshin Express
 Malwa Express
 Punjab Mail
 Taj Express
 Grand Trunk Express
 Mahakaushal Express
 Gwalior–Ahmedabad Superfast Express

References

Railway stations in Morena district
Jhansi railway division
Morena